Sixteen ships of the Royal Navy have borne the name HMS Lark or HMS Larke, after the bird, the lark:

 was a pinnace in service in 1588.
 was an 8-gun ship captured by the Parliamentarians from the Royalists in 1656 and sold in 1663.
 was an 18-gun sixth rate launched in 1675 and sold in 1698.
 was a 42-gun fourth rate launched in 1703, rebuilt in 1726, hulked in 1742 and wrecked in 1744.
 was a 44-gun fifth rate launched in 1744 and sold in 1757.
 was a 32-gun fifth rate launched in 1762 and burnt to avoid being captured in 1778.
 was a 16-gun cutter purchased in 1779, rigged as a sloop from 1781 and sold in 1784.
 was a 16-gun sloop launched in 1794. She foundered in 1809.
 was a 2-gun survey cutter launched in 1830 and broken up in 1860.
 was a  screw gunboat launched in 1855 and sold in 1878. 
 was a survey schooner, previously in civilian service as the Falcon. She was purchased in 1877,  renamed HMS Sparrowhawk later that year and sold in 1889.
 was a survey schooner launched in 1880 and sold in 1887.
She was renamed HMS Lark in 1892 and HMS Cruizer in 1893. She was sold in 1919.
She was renamed HMS Cruiser in 1857 and HMS Lark in 1893 as a training ship. She was sold in 1912.
 was a  destroyer, previously named HMS Haughty but renamed shortly after being launched in 1913. She was sold in 1923.
 was a modified  sloop launched in 1943. She was torpedoed in 1945, salvaged by the Russians and recommissioned with them as Neptun. She was scrapped in 1956.

See also

Royal Navy ship names